Vladko Shalamanov (born 25 April 1967) is a former Bulgarian footballer who played as a midfielder.

Career
Shalamanov played for a number of teams in the top Bulgarian league, most notably for Levski Sofia and Slavia Sofia. He used to captain the latter and in December 2013 was one of the footballers honoured with a special prize at a ceremony commemorating 100 years since the founding of the "whites". Shalamanov also plied his trade abroad, having short spells in Greece and Turkey. He additionally spent four years in Portugal before retiring from the game. He made his debut for Bulgaria on 12 April 1995, in the 0:0 away draw with Macedonia in a friendly match.

Honours

Club
Levski Sofia
 Bulgarian A Group: 1992–93
 Bulgarian Cup (2): 1986, 1991

References

External links
 Player Profile at LevskiSofia.info
 
 

1967 births
Living people
Bulgarian footballers
Association football midfielders
PFC Levski Sofia players
FC Lokomotiv 1929 Sofia players
PFC Slavia Sofia players
OFC Sliven 2000 players
First Professional Football League (Bulgaria) players
Bulgaria international footballers
Aris Thessaloniki F.C. players
Expatriate footballers in Greece
Bulgarian expatriate sportspeople in Greece
Expatriate footballers in Turkey
Bulgarian expatriate sportspeople in Turkey
Portimonense S.C. players
Expatriate footballers in Portugal
Bulgarian expatriate sportspeople in Portugal
Bulgarian expatriate footballers

bg:Владко Шаламанов